Osmose New Zealand Ltd v Wakeling [2007] 1 NZLR 841 is a cited case in New Zealand regarding claims in defamation and the defence of free speech.

Background
Osmose New Zealand Limited manufactured and sold a timber treatment product that Dr Wakeling and Dr Smith in their opinions as scientists, claimed did not work as it should have, contributing to the "leaky homes crisis". Wakeling's statements on the matter were repeated on Radio New Zealand and in The New Zealand Herald.

Osmose subsequently sued Wakeling for defamation for $14,737,778, and Wakelin sought to have RNZ and the Herald joined as co-defendants on the defamation claim, and they claim that re-publication of Wakelings original statements was protected by privilege, as well as under "Lange".

Held
The High Court ruled that in the absence of any malice, the mere republication of statements was privileged, and so was not defamation.

References

High Court of New Zealand cases
New Zealand tort case law
2007 in case law
2007 in New Zealand law